Hannes Smolders (born 24 February 1998) is a Belgian footballer who plays as a centre back for Dessel Sport.

Club career
Hannes Smolders started his career with KV Mechelen. Smolders re-joined Lierse on 1 January 2019 on a loan deal, that was confirmed already on 7 December 2018.

In the summer of 2022, Smolders signed a two-year contract with Dessel Sport.

References

External links
 
 Hannes Smolders  at KV Mechelen

1998 births
People from Lier, Belgium
Footballers from Antwerp Province
Living people
Association football central defenders
Belgian footballers
K.V. Mechelen players
Lierse S.K. players
Lierse Kempenzonen players
KFC Houtvenne players
K.F.C. Dessel Sport players
Belgian Pro League players
Challenger Pro League players